Mikayla Martin (8 January 1997 — 1 October 2019) was a Canadian alpine skiing and ski cross athlete. Martin competed for the alpine ski team of British Columbia from 2014 to 2017. While competing in Super G events, Martin was 10th at the 2015 National Junior Championships and 4th in the 2017 National Championships. In 2017, Martin joined the Canadian ski cross team for Alpine Canada. During her six events at the 2018–19 FIS Freestyle Ski World Cup, she finished sixth during a race in Innichen, Italy. At ski cross events held at FIS championships, Martin won gold at the 2018 FIS Freestyle Junior World Ski Championships and did not start the small final at the FIS Freestyle Ski and Snowboarding World Championships 2019.

Biography
Martin was born in Squamish, British Columbia on 8 January 1997. Martin began skiing when she was three years old and competed in slalom skiing events as a young adult. She placed sixth at the 2009 provincial championships and qualified for the 2010 BC Winter Games. From 2014 to 2017, Martin competed on the alpine ski team for British Columbia. During these years, Martin raced at the Nor-Am Cup primarily in the giant slalom and super G disciplines while also racing in downhill skiing, slalom skiing and alpine combined. Her best results came in 2015, when she had a top-8 finish at the downhill event at Lake Louise and the alpine combined event in Panorama.

In 2017, Martin became a member of the ladies Canadian Ski Cross team for Alpine Canada in the C&D classes. Martin was renominated for Alpine Canada in 2018 and 2019. In 2018, Martin finished in the top three twice at Nor-Am Cup events and once at Europa Cup events. The following year, Martin won a Europa Cup event at Gudauri and had two third-place finishes at the Australian and New Zealand Cup. While competing at six ski cross events in the 2018–19 FIS Freestyle Ski World Cup season, Martin had a sixth place in Innichen, Italy.

In championships between 2014 and 2019, Martin was 4th at the 2017 National Championships in the Super G event. During this time period, she also was 10th in the Super G event during the 2015 National Junior Championships. At the 2018 FIS Freestyle Junior World Ski Championships, Martin won gold in ski cross. The following year, Martin reached the small final in ski cross at the FIS Freestyle Ski and Snowboarding World Championships 2019. During the race, Martin crashed and received a Did Not Start placing. On 1 October 2019, Martin died from an accident riding her mountain bike in Squamish. Outside of skiing, Martin had certifications in scuba diving and motorcycle riding. Following her death the community of Squamish came together to build an all levels mountain bike trail called Mikis Magic.

References

1997 births
2019 deaths
Canadian female alpine skiers